Bon-e Gonbad (also Romanized as Bon Gonbad; also known as Bān Gonbad, Bankunbad, and Boneh Gonbad) is a village in Malmir Rural District, Sarband District, Shazand County, Markazi Province, Iran. At the 2006 census, its population was 67, in 19 families.

References 

Populated places in Shazand County